Tuzsér is a village in Szabolcs-Szatmár-Bereg county, in the Northern Great Plain region of eastern Hungary.

Geography

References
 Lafferton, E., "Death by Hypnosis: An 1894 Hungarian Case and its European Reverberations", Endeavour, Vol.30, No.2, (June 2006), pp. 65–70.
(Provides an extended account of the death of a hypnotic subject, 22 years old Ella Salomon, during a hypnotic séance in the Salomon Castle in Tuzsér in September 1894.)

Populated places in Szabolcs-Szatmár-Bereg County